Arpia is a monotypic moth genus of the family Noctuidae. Its only species, Arpia janeira, is found in the Brazilian states of Rio de Janeiro and Espírito Santo. Both the genus and species were first described by Schaus in 1896.

References

Agaristinae
Monotypic moth genera